Blackface is a studio album by the R&B group Shai. It was produced by Shai; the group spent nine months working on it.

The album peaked at No. 42 on the Billboard 200. Its first single was "Come with Me".

Critical reception

The Washington Post concluded that "when Carl Martin, Darnell Van Rensalier, Garfield Bright and Marc Gay stack their voices in one unexpected chord after another, though, they capture the hope and anxiety of young love like few other acts today." The Los Angeles Times determined that Shai "saves its best vocals for the album's one a cappella track, 'If I Gave (A Confession of Hope)', a spiritual that is moving in its sheer simplicity."

AllMusic noted that "the first half of the disc is devoted to seductive slow numbers, while the second part is dominated by deep bass grooves."

Track listing 
"Come with Me" – 4:39
"During the Storm" – 4:38
"I Don't Wanna Be Alone" – 4:54
"Mr. Turn U Out" – 4:40
"Concert a (The Hidden One)" – 1:57
"Falling" – 5:11
"Planet Solitude" – 1:12
"Did You Know" – 4:00
"To Get to Know You" – 4:00
"Let's Go Back" – 4:22
"Will I Find Someone" – 3:53
"95" – 3:23
"The Place Where You Belong" – 4:21
"If I Gave (A Confession of Hope)" – 2:07

Singles
Come With Me - September 26, 1995
I Don't Wanna Be Alone - April 9, 1996

Formats
Cassette - October 17, 1995, MCA
UK Release - December 23, 1999, Universal
Japan Release - December 2, 2003, Victor

References

1995 albums
MCA Records albums
Shai (band) albums